Melisa Nicolau Martín (born 20 June 1984), commonly known as Melisa or Mely, is a Spanish former footballer, who played as a defender for Primera División clubs Rayo Vallecano and FC Barcelona, as well as the Spain women's national football team.

She has been a member of the Spain women's national football team, playing the qualification stages for the 2007 World Cup, the 2009 European Championship and the 2011 World Cup.

In June 2013, national team coach Ignacio Quereda confirmed Melisa as a member of his 23-player squad for the UEFA Women's Euro 2013 finals in Sweden. She decided to end her nine-year national team career and retire from football after the tournament.

Titles
 2 leagues: 2009, 2010 (Rayo Vallecano)
 2 leagues: 2012, 2013 (F.C. Barcelona)
 1 national cup: 2008 (Rayo Vallecano)
 2 national cups: 2010, 2013 (F.C. Barcelona)

References

1984 births
Living people
Spanish women's footballers
Spain women's international footballers
Footballers from Mallorca
Primera División (women) players
Rayo Vallecano Femenino players
FC Barcelona Femení players
Women's association football defenders
Spain women's youth international footballers
21st-century Spanish women